Papilio machaonides, the machaonides swallowtail, is a species of Neotropical swallowtail butterfly from the genus Papilio that is found in Hispaniola and is also thought to inhabit the Cayman Islands.

Description
Papilio machaonides has been described as having 'slow and floppy' flight. The discal band of the forewing is interrupted, the posterior part contiguous with the cell-spot, forming an oblique band.

Status
It is a very common butterfly throughout Hispaniola, occurring from sea-level to high elevation. It is most commonly seen in July and August.

Philately
The butterfly appeared on a Haitian 1969 0.25 gourde stamp. It was in the Michel catalog 1094.

References

Lewis, H. L., 1974 Butterflies of the World  Page 25, figure 8

machaonides
Butterflies described in 1796
Taxa named by Eugenius Johann Christoph Esper
Insects of the Dominican Republic
Insects of Haiti